Glasgow High School(GHS), located in unincorporated New Castle County, Delaware, is one of the three traditional public high schools in Christina School District. GHS serves portions of Glasgow, Bear, Newark, and Wilmington.

History
GHS, opened in fall 1973, was built to accommodate more than 2,000 students and to reduce strain on the two other schools in the district.

Athletics
GHS is part of the Delaware Interscholastic Athletic Association and the Blue Hen Conference (Division II).

Notable alumni
Marc Egerson, former Georgetown University, University of Delaware, NBL, and Israeli Basketball Premier League player
Emmanuel Savary, competitive ice skater

References

External links
 
 District website

Educational institutions established in 1973
High schools in New Castle County, Delaware
Public high schools in Delaware
1973 establishments in Delaware